The Tuirini is a river of Mizoram, northeastern India. a 42 MW Hydel project is being planned in Tuirini River.

Geography
It originates from Hmangkawn Village in Aizawl District. It flows northward to join the Tuirial River Northwest of Seling. It is about 55 km from Aizawl.

References

Rivers of Mizoram
Rivers of India